Copris sodalis, is a species of dung beetle found in India, and Sri Lanka.

Description
This shortly oval, very convex species has an average length of about 15 mm. Body black, shiny and smooth. Antennae, and mouthparts are red in color. Hairs upon the legs and the sides of ventrum are also reddish. Shiny head is finely and rugosely punctured. Pronotum and metasternal shield are unpunctured almost without punctures. Elytra are deeply sulcate. Pygidium fairly strongly and less punctured. In male, there is a slender compressed horn in head. Female has a short, transverse, elevated carina in head.

References

Scarabaeinae
Insects of Sri Lanka
Insects of India
Beetles described in 1858